The rex Nemorensis (Latin, "king of Nemi" or "king of the Grove") was a priest of the goddess Diana at Aricia in Italy, by the shores of Lake Nemi, where she was known as Diana Nemorensis.  The priesthood played a major role in the mythography of James George Frazer in The Golden Bough; his interpretation has exerted a lasting influence.

Ancient sources
The tale of the rex Nemorensis appears in a number of ancient sources.  Ovid gives a poetic account of the priesthood of Nemi noting that the lake of Nemi was "sacred to antique religion", and that the priest who dwelt there "holds his reign by strong hands and fleet feet, and dies according to the example he set himself."

The Latin name of the priesthood is given by Suetonius: "He [Caligula] caused the rex Nemorensis, who had held his priesthood for many years, to be supplanted by a stronger adversary." That same passage indicates that by the time of the early Principate, the custom of succession in the office by combat had become subject to outside control.

The Greek geographer Strabo also mentions the institution: "and in fact a barbaric, and Scythian, element predominates in the sacred usages, for the people set up as priest merely a run-away slave who has slain with his own hand the man previously consecrated to that office; accordingly the priest is always armed with a sword, looking around for the attacks, and ready to defend himself."

Pausanias gives an etiological myth on the founding of the shrine:

In Roman mythology, Hippolytus was deified as the god Virbius; Artemis was the Greek name of the goddess identified with the Roman Diana. A possible allusion to the origins of the priesthood at Nemi is contained in Vergil's Aeneid, as Virgil places Hippolytus at the grove of Aricia.

An alternative story has the worship of Diana at Nemi instituted by Orestes; the flight of the slave represents the flight of Orestes into exile.

Ritual murder
Surviving lore concerning the rex Nemorensis indicates that this priest or king held a very uneasy position. Macaulay's quatrain on the institution of the rex Nemorensis states:
 Those trees in whose dim shadowThe ghastly priest doth reignThe priest who slew the slayer,And shall himself be slain.
This is, in a nutshell, the surviving legend of the rex Nemorensis: the priesthood of Diana at Nemi was held by a person who obtained that honour by slaying the prior incumbent in a trial by combat, and who could remain at the post only so long as he successfully defended his position against all challengers.  However, a successful candidate had first to test his mettle by plucking a golden bough from one of the trees in the sacred grove.

The human sacrifice conducted at Nemi was thought to be highly unusual by the ancients. Suetonius mentions it as an example of the moral failings of Caligula. Strabo calls it Scythian, implying that he found it barbaric.  The violent character of this singular institution could barely be justified by reference to its great antiquity and mythological sanctity.  The ancient sources also appear to concur that an escaped slave who seeks refuge in this uneasy office is likely to be a desperate man.

The Golden Bough

James George Frazer, in his seminal work The Golden Bough, argued that the tale of the priesthood of Nemi was an instance of a worldwide myth of a sacred king who must periodically die as part of a regular fertility rite.  

In 1990, a radio programme entitled "The Priest of Nemi" was produced by Michael Bakewell and broadcast on BBC Radio 3. This programme was based on
the 1990 book The Making of the Golden Bough by Robert Fraser,  which was written to mark the centenary of the first edition of Frazer's book.

External references
The novel Nemorensis, by Simon Spurrier (set in the universe of the Elite: Dangerous MMORPG), is based on the legend.

Notes

Bibliography
 Fraser, Robert. The Making of the Golden Bough: The Origins and Growth of An Argument Macmillan, 1990. 
 Frazer, Sir James G. The Golden Bough Macmillan, 1950, abridged edition.
 Hornblower, Simon, et al. (eds.) The Oxford Classical Dictionary (3d edition. 2003)

External links
Blog of exhibition of Nemi material at Nottingham museum 2013
Nemi at Nottingham project
The Oleaster at the End of the Æneid by Julia Dyson
Lays of Ancient Rome by Baron Thomas Babington Macaulay Macaulay from Project Gutenberg

Sacred groves
Ancient Roman religious titles
Diana (mythology)
Ancient Roman priests
Lake Nemi